Peak calling is a computational method used to identify areas in a genome that have been enriched with aligned reads as a consequence of performing a ChIP-sequencing or MeDIP-seq experiment. These areas are those where a protein interacts with DNA. When the protein is a transcription factor, the enriched area is its transcription factor binding site (TFBS). Popular software programs include MACS. Wilbanks and colleagues is a survey of the ChIP-seq peak callers, and Bailey et al. is a description of practical guidelines for peak calling in ChIP-seq data.

Peak calling may be conducted on transcriptome/exome as well to RNA epigenome sequencing data from MeRIPseq or m6Aseq for detection of post-transcriptional RNA modification sites with software programs, such as exomePeak.
Many of the peak calling tools are optimised for only some kind of assays such as only for transcription-factor ChIP-seq or only for DNase-seq. However new generation of peak callers such as DFilter  are based on generalised optimal theory of detection and has been shown to work for nearly all kinds for tag profile signals from next-gen sequencing data. It is also possible to do more complex analysis using such tools like combining multiple ChIP-seq signal to detect regulatory sites. 

In the context of ChIP-exo, this process is known as 'peak-pair calling'.

Differential peak calling is about identifying significant differences in two ChIP-seq signals. One can distinguish between one-stage and two-stage differential peak callers. One stage differential peak callers work in two phases: first, call peaks on individual ChIP-seq signals and second, combine individual signals and apply statistical tests to estimate differential peaks. DBChIP and MAnorm are examples for one stage differential peak callers.

Two stage differential peak callers segment two ChIP-seq signals and identify differential peaks in one step. They take advantage of signal segmentation approaches such as Hidden Markov Models. Examples for two-stage differential peak callers are ChIPDiff, ODIN. and THOR.
Differential peak calling can also be applied in the context of analyzing RNA-binding protein binding sites.

See also 
ChIP-sequencing
CLIP-Seq
DNA Sequencing

References 

Peak calling
Peak calling
Peak calling